Neunhausen is a village in north-western Luxembourg. It is part of the canton of Wiltz, which is part of the district of Diekirch.

Previously, it was a former commune – the smallest in Luxembourg in terms of both population and population density – until it was merged into Esch-sur-Sûre (with Heiderscheid) in 2011.

, the village of Neunhausen had a population of 62.

Former commune
The former commune consisted of the villages:

 Bonnal (former seat)
 Insenborn
 Lultzhausen
 Neunhausen
 Bourgfried (lieu-dit)

References

Communes in Wiltz (canton)
Villages in Luxembourg